Faridah Seriki, known professionally as Kah-Lo is a Nigerian singer-songwriter, best known for her song ‘Fasta’ and for her work on 'Rinse and Repeat' with British DJ, Riton. The track was nominated for Best Dance Recording at the 59th Grammy Awards. Together, she and Riton have released 'Betta Riddim', 'Money' ft. Mr. Eazi and Davido, and Triple J hits 'Fake ID' and 'Ginger'. 

Her debut single Fasta was released on 11 August 2017. The song was chosen as BBC Radio 1 DJ Annie Mac's hottest record in the world on 22 August 2017.

Her collaborative album "Foreign Ororo" with Riton was released on 5 October 2018.

Biography 
Seriki was born and raised in Lagos, Nigeria, where she attended Vivian Fowler Memorial College. In 2009 she moved to New York where she graduated from Hofstra University in 2013 and worked marketing there. Through Soundcloud and Twitter she started collaborating with Riton, starting her professional music career.

Discography

Albums
Riton: Foreign Ororo (2018)

Extended plays
The Arrival (2021)

Singles
 Riton: "Fasta" (2017)
 "Exit Sign" (2019)
 "Drag Me Out" (2022)

Features
Riton: "Rinse & Repeat" (2016)
Riton: "Betta Riddim" (2016)
Riton: "Fake ID" (2017)
Riton: "Ginger" (2018) 
Riton: "Up & Down" (2018)
Michael Brun: "Spice" (2018)
Riton, Mr Eazi: "Catching Feelings" (2018)
Riton: "Bad Boy" (2018) 
Idris Elba: "Ballie" (2019)
Diplo, Blond:ish: "Give Dem" (2019)
Perto: “Bad Maybe Good” (2019) 
The Knocks: "Awa Ni" (2019)
Michael Brun: "Melanin" (2020)

Awards and nominations

Grammy Awards

References

Year of birth missing (living people)
Place of birth missing (living people)
Living people
Hofstra University alumni
The Lawrence Herbert School of Communication alumni
Nigerian women singer-songwriters
Nigerian singer-songwriters